Farmington is an unincorporated community in Oconee County, Georgia, United States. Farmington has a post office with ZIP code 30638.

History
The Georgia General Assembly incorporated the place in 1919 as the "Town of Farmington". The community was so named on account of its location within a farming district. The town's municipal charter was repealed in 1995.

Notable people
Bill Berry, drummer and founding member of R.E.M.

References

Former municipalities in Georgia (U.S. state)
Unincorporated communities in Oconee County, Georgia
Unincorporated communities in Georgia (U.S. state)
Populated places disestablished in 1995